The women's 100 metres sprint event at the 1948 Olympic Games took place July 31 and August 2.  The final was won by Dutchwoman Fanny Blankers-Koen.

Records
Prior to the competition, the existing World and Olympic records were as follows.

Schedule
All times are British Summer Time (UTC+1).

Results

Round 1

The fastest two runners in each heat advanced to the semifinals.

Heat 1

Heat 2

Heat 3

Heat 4

Heat 5

Heat 6

Heat 7

Heat 8

Heat 9

Semifinals

The fastest two runners in each heat advanced to the final.

Semifinal 1

Semifinal 2

Semifinal 3

Final

References

External links
Organising Committee for the XIV Olympiad, The (1948). The Official Report of the Organising Committee for the XIV Olympiad. LA84 Foundation. Retrieved 4 September 2016.

Athletics at the 1948 Summer Olympics
100 metres at the Olympics
1948 in women's athletics
Ath